Joanne Sharon Angela Duncan (born 27 December 1966) is an English shot putter. She was born in Plaistow.

Her personal best put is 17.13 metres, achieved in August 2006 in Crawley. This places her seventh on the British outdoor all-time list, behind Judy Oakes, Myrtle Augee, Meg Ritchie, Venissa Head, Angela Littlewood and Yvonne Hanson-Nortey.

International competitions

References

External links 

1966 births
Living people
People from Plaistow, Newham
Athletes from London
British female shot putters
English female shot putters
Commonwealth Games competitors for England
Athletes (track and field) at the 2002 Commonwealth Games
Athletes (track and field) at the 2006 Commonwealth Games
British Athletics Championships winners